Athar Fi al-Rimal (Traces in the Sand) is a 1954 Egyptian drama film directed by Gamal Madkoor. It starred Imad Hamdi and Faten Hamama.

Faten Hamama plays Ragia, a woman who helps Ibrahim (Imad Hamdi) retain his memory and tell the story of his sister's death.

References

External links 
 

1954 films
1950s Arabic-language films
1954 drama films
Egyptian drama films
Egyptian black-and-white films